Colin Harrison (born 1960 in New York City) is an American novelist and editor.
Harrison is the author of eight novels: Break and Enter (1990), Bodies Electric (1993), Manhattan Nocturne (1996), Afterburn (2000), The Havana Room (2004), The Finder (2008), Risk (2009), which was first published as a fifteen-part serial in The New York Times magazine in 2008, and You Belong to Me, published in June 2017. His books have been published in a dozen countries and four have been selected as Notable Books by The New York Times Book Review. The Finder was a finalist for the 2009 Los Angeles Times Book Prize and the 2009 Dashiell Hammett Award. All are atmospheric novels of violence, sex, and suspense that explore the underside of city life, most particularly in New York. Although his novels invariably involve the money and power that is concentrated in Manhattan, his stories usually snake through the boroughs outside Manhattan as well, in particular through Brooklyn, which has served as a setting for scenes in Bodies Electric (Park Slope and Sunset Park), Manhattan Nocturne (East New York), The Finder (Marine Park, Bensonhurst) and Risk (Canarsie). A movie version of Manhattan Nocturne, directed and written by Brian DeCubellis and titled Manhattan Night, was released by Lionsgate in May 2016. The movie stars Adrien Brody, Yvonne Strahovski, Campbell Scott, Jennifer Beals, and others.

His short nonfiction has appeared in The New York Times, New York Magazine, The Washington Post, the Chicago Tribune, Vogue, Salon, Worth, and other publications and anthologies, including Brooklyn Was Mine, edited by Chris Knutsen and Valerie Steiker.

He has lived since 1987 in the Park Slope neighborhood of Brooklyn, with his wife, the writer Kathryn Harrison, with whom he has three children. He was an editor at Harper's Magazine from 1989 until 2001 and in that time worked with such writers as David Foster Wallace, Jonathan Franzen, Jane Smiley, Russell Banks, Michael Paternite, Lucy Grealy, Thom Jones, Scott Anderson, Sebastian Junger, Ken Kalfus, Verlyn Klinkenborg, Barbara Ehrenreich, Charles Bowden, Joy Williams, David Quammen, William H. Gass, Joe Conason, David Guterson, Bob Shacochis, Joyce Carol Oates,  Lewis Lapham, and many others. In 2001 he was appointed senior editor at Scribner, an imprint of Simon & Schuster, where he edits both fiction and non-fiction. In 2013, he became Scribner's editor-in-chief. Among the many writers he has worked there with are Anthony Swofford, Jeff Hobbs, Jason Matthews, Nic Pizzolatto, Helen Thorpe, Marc Fisher and Michael Kranish of The Washington Post, Ted Fishman, Kem Nunn, John Dalton, Richard Snow, Craig Nelson, Greg Iles, Bruce Weber, Craig Unger, Steven Johnson, Alexandra Horowitz, Rick Perlstein, Carol Sklenicka, Kevin Fedarko, Linda Fairstein, Robert Ferrigno, Daniel Okrent, Doug Stanton, S.G. Gwynne, and Chuck Hogan. From 1993 to 2003 he taught intermittently at Columbia University's undergraduate writing program and served as a thesis advisor for the MFA program.

Harrison attended the University of Iowa Writers' Workshop (MFA, 1986), and studied for one year in the university's American Studies doctoral program before moving to New York. He is also a graduate of Haverford College (BA, 1982), and Westtown School (1978), a coeducational Quaker boarding school, where his father, Earl Harrison Jr., was headmaster.

References

20th-century American novelists
21st-century American novelists
American male novelists
Living people
1960 births
American editors
Iowa Writers' Workshop alumni
Haverford College alumni
Westtown School alumni
20th-century American male writers
21st-century American male writers